There are two species of skink named southern grass skink:

 Pseudemoia entrecasteauxii, endemic to Australia
 Heremites septemtaeniatus, found in the Middle East